Helmet-flower is a common name for several plants and may refer to:

 Aconitum napellus, in the family Ranunculaceae and endemic to Europe
 Coryanthes spp., in the family Orchidaceae
 Scutellaria spp., in the family Lamiaceae